Run Out is a 2015 Bangladeshi action romance film written by Rafiqul Islam Poltu. Directed by Tonmoy Tansen, it is presented by Sadat Mahmud Tanvir as a production of New Gen Entertainment. Development began in February 2012. The film stars Shajal Noor, Rumana Swarna, Mousumi Nag, Tanvir Hossain Probal, Mahmudul Islam Selim, Sabiha Masum, Goutam Saha, Jubayer Hillol, Zara, Aurindom Nattya Gosthi and Tariq Anam Khan in a cameo in the film.

Cast
 Shajal Noor as Kishore
 Mousumi Nag as Zenith
 Rumana Swarna as Nila
 Tanvir Hossain Probal
 Tariq Anam Khan
 Mahmudul Islam Selim
 Omar Sani
 Ahmed Sharif
 Naila Nayem as an item number

Soundtrack
 Opekkha
 Janala Khole Dao
 Jotota Dure
 Ekbar Bolo
 Elomelo (Kromosh)
 Opekkha (2nd Version)
 Mon Diye Mon Nite

See also
 List of Bangladeshi films of 2015

References

Further reading
 
 
 
 
 

Bengali-language Bangladeshi films
2010s romantic action films
Bangladeshi romantic action films
2010s Bengali-language films